Domenic Di Rosa (born February 1, 1979) is a Canadian actor. His credits include the television series Big Wolf on Campus, Are You Afraid of the Dark, The Truth About the Harry Quebert Affair and Crave's hit comedy Letterkenny. Most recently he played Father Gabriel in National Geographic's limited series, Barkskins. He also played a supporting role in the Canadian crime drama, Mafia Inc., Pieces of a Woman, Most Wanted and now the latest installment of the Transformers series, Transformers: Rise of the Beasts.

Personal 
Di Rosa was born and raised in Montréal's east end from a Sicilian mother and French-Canadian father.
He is married and has 4 children.

Filmography

Film

Television

References

External links

1979 births
Living people
Canadian male film actors
Canadian male television actors